The Sahib Ata Complex is a multifunctionary funerary complex located in Konya, Turkey. It was built between 1258 and 1285 for Sahib Ata (died 1285), a high-ranking member of the ruling elite of the Sultanate of Rum who rose to prominence after the conquest of the Sultanate by the Mongols. The patron of the complex was Sahib Ata himself. It consists of a series of buildings that were built during aforementioned time span. Construction of the Complex commenced in 1258 with the construction of the mosque.

References

Buildings and structures in Konya
Tourist attractions in Konya
Buildings and structures of the Sultanate of Rum
13th-century establishments in Asia
Mausoleums in Turkey